The 1968 Espirito Santo Trophy took place 2–5 October at Victoria Golf Club in Cheltenham, south of central Melbourne, Victoria, Australia. It was the third women's golf World Amateur Team Championship for the Espirito Santo Trophy. The tournament was a 72-hole stroke play team event with 17 three-woman teams. The best two scores for each round counted towards the team total.

The United States won the Trophy, beating the host nation Australia by five strokes. Australia took the silver medal while France, one stroke further behind, took the bronze, just as they did in the last championship two years earlier.

Teams 
17 teams contested the event. Each team had three players.

Results 

Sources:

Individual leaders 
There was no official recognition for the lowest individual scores.

References

External link 
World Amateur Team Championships on International Golf Federation website

Espirito Santo Trophy
Golf tournaments in Australia
Espirito Santo Trophy
Espirito Santo Trophy
Espirito Santo Trophy